Beinn nan Eun (743 m) is a mountain in the Northwest Highlands of Scotland. It is located in Easter Ross, several miles northwest of Dingwall.

A very remote peak, it is located on the wild moorland above Loch Glass. Ben Wyvis lies to its south.

References

Marilyns of Scotland
Grahams
Mountains and hills of the Northwest Highlands